Birthday Blues is the sixth album by Scottish folk musician Bert Jansch, released in 1969.

Track listing 
All songs composed by Bert Jansch except where noted.
 "Come Sing Me a Happy Song to Prove We All Can Get Along the Lumpy, Bumpy, Long and Dusty Road" – 2:05
 "The Bright New Year" – 1:34
 "Tree Song" – 2:37
 "Poison" – 3:16
 "Miss Heather Rosemary Sewell" – 2:10
 "I've Got a Woman" – 5:15
 "A Woman Like You" – 4:27
 "I Am Lonely" – 2:31
 "Promised Land" – 2:51
 "Birthday Blues" – 1:14
 "Wishing Well" (Jansch, Anne Briggs) – 2:17
 "Blues" – 2:40

Personnel 
 Bert Jansch - vocals, guitars
 Danny Thompson - bass
 Terry Cox - drums
 Ray Warleigh - alto saxophone, flute
 Duffy Power - harmonica
Technical
Damon Lyon-Shaw - engineer
Hans Feurer - cover photography
Heather Jansch - cover design
Gordon House - graphics

References 

Bert Jansch albums
1969 albums
Albums produced by Shel Talmy
Transatlantic Records albums
Albums recorded at IBC Studios